The Addison Kimball House in Madison, Ohio is a house with corner post construction on a fieldstone foundation that was built in 1815.  It appears to be a -story house but is a full two-story house on the inside.  It was built by Addison Kimball, son of Lemuel Kimball.  Addison was the first homebuilder in Madison;  this house is notable as the only house that can definitely be attributed to him.

It was listed on the National Register of Historic Places in 1975.

References

Houses on the National Register of Historic Places in Ohio
Federal architecture in Ohio
Houses completed in 1815
Houses in Lake County, Ohio
National Register of Historic Places in Lake County, Ohio